Vityaz Podolsk may refer to:

FC Vityaz Podolsk, a football (soccer) club based in Podolsk, Russia
HC Vityaz Podolsk, an ice hockey team based in Podolsk, Russia